Tidal wave may refer to:

Seas and oceans
 A tidal bore, which is a large movement of water formed by the funnelling of the incoming tide into a river or narrow bay
 A storm surge, or tidal surge, which can cause waves that breach flood defences
 A tsunami, a series of water waves in a body of water caused by the displacement of a large volume of water, although this usage of "tidal wave" is a misnomer and is disfavored by the scientific community.
 A megatsunami, which is an informal term to describe a tsunami that has initial wave heights that are much larger than normal tsunamis
 The crest (physics) of a tide as it moves around the Earth

Film 
 The Tidal Wave, a 1920 British silent film
 Tidal Wave (1973 film), a film based on novel Japan Sinks
 Tidal Wave (2009 film), a South Korean disaster movie

Amusements
 Tidal Wave (Thorpe Park), the theme park ride at Thorpe Park, in the United Kingdom
 Tidal Wave (Transformers), a Decepticon in the Transformers universe

Military 
 Operation Tidal Wave, a 1943 World War II military operation

Music 
 Tidal Wave (band), a band associated with the United States Naval Academy Band

Albums
 Tidal Wave (Denny Zeitlin album), a 1984 album by Denny Zeitlin, with Charlie Haden, John Abercrombie and Peter Donald
 Tidal Wave (The Apples EP), the 1993 EP debut release by The Apples in Stereo, and song on the album Fun Trick Noisemaker
 Tidal Wave (Longwave album), a 2004 album by Longwave
 Tidal Wave (Julie Anne San Jose album), a 2015 album by Filipina singer Julie Anne San Jose
 Tidal Wave (Taking Back Sunday album), a 2016 album by Taking Back Sunday
 Tidal Wave (Young Liars album), a 2014 album by Canadian indie pop rock band Young Liars

Songs
 "Tidal Wave" (song), a song by Sub Focus, 2012
 "Tidal Wave", a song by The Apples, 1993
 "Tidal Wave", a song by Apollo 100,  1973
 "Tidal Wave", a song by the band The Challengers, 1963
 "Tidal Wave", a song by Clancy Eccles, 1976
 "Tidal Wave", a song by Gorky's Zygotic Mynci, on their 1998 album Gorky 5
 "Tidal Wave", a song by Frankie Paul, 1985
 "Tidal Wave", a song by Husky, 2012
 "Tidal Wave," a 2014 song by Interpol on their album El Pintor
 "Tidal Wave", a song by John Foxx on his 1980 album Metamatic
 "Tidal Wave", a song by Karmin from Pulses
 "Tidal Wave", a B-side to 2008 single "Spaceman" by the rock band The Killers
 "Tidal Wave", a song by Owl City on their 2009 album Ocean Eyes
 "Tidal Wave", a song by Ronnie Laws and Pressure, 1975
 "Tidal Wave", a song by The Sugarcubes on the 1989 album Here Today, Tomorrow Next Week!
 "Tidal Wave", a song by Thee Oh Sees
 "Tidal Wave", a song by The Upsetters
 "Tidal Wave", a song by Portugal. The Man
 "Tidal Wave", a song by S*M*A*S*H
 "Tidal Waves", a 2015 song by All Time Low from Future Hearts
 "Tidal Wave", a 1974 song by The Ozark Mountain Daredevils from It'll Shine When It Shines
 "Tidal Wave", a song by Chase Atlantic, 2018

See also
 A rogue wave of up to 100 feet high, often in the middle of the ocean and against prevailing current and wave direction